Faema was a  professional cycling team that existed from 1955 to 1962. The team's main sponsor was espresso machine manufacturer Faema.

References

External links

Defunct cycling teams based in Italy
Defunct cycling teams based in Belgium
Defunct cycling teams based in Spain
1955 establishments in Italy
1962 disestablishments in Belgium
Cycling teams established in 1955
Cycling teams disestablished in 1962
Faema